The 1984 SEC women's basketball tournament took place March 2nd through 5th, 1984 in Athens, Georgia.

Georgia won the tournament by beating Alabama in the championship game.

Tournament

Asterisk denotes game ended in overtime.

All-Tournament team 
Cassandra Crumpton, Alabama (MVP)
Teresa Edwards, Georgia
Janet Harris, Georgia
Wanda Holloway, Georgia
Joyce Walker, LSU
Donna Atkinson, Vanderbilt

References

SEC women's basketball tournament
1984 in sports in Georgia (U.S. state)